Ingo Voge (born 14 February 1958 in Falkensee, GDR) is an East German bobsledder who competed during the 1980s. Competing in two Winter Olympics, he won two silver medals in the four-man event (1984, 1988).

Voge also won two medals in the four-man event at the FIBT World Championships with a gold in 1985 and a bronze in 1989.

References
 Bobsleigh four-man Olympic medalists for 1924, 1932–56, and since 1964
 Bobsleigh four-man world championship medalists since 1930
 DatabaseOlympics.com profile

1958 births
Living people
People from Havelland
People from Bezirk Potsdam
German male bobsledders
Sportspeople from Brandenburg
National People's Army military athletes
Olympic bobsledders of East Germany
Bobsledders at the 1984 Winter Olympics
Bobsledders at the 1988 Winter Olympics
Olympic silver medalists for East Germany
Olympic medalists in bobsleigh
Medalists at the 1984 Winter Olympics
Medalists at the 1988 Winter Olympics
Recipients of the Patriotic Order of Merit in silver